John Carew Rolfe, Ph.D. (October 15, 1859 in Newburyport, Massachusetts – March 26, 1943) was an American classical scholar, the son of William J. Rolfe.

Rolfe graduated from Harvard University in 1881 and from Cornell University (Ph.D.) in 1885.

Rolfe taught at Cornell (1882–1885), at Harvard (1889–1890), at the University of Michigan, and at the University of Pennsylvania.

Rolfe was a professor from 1907–1908 at the American School of Classical Studies and at the American Academy in Rome from 1923–1924. He continued to serve at the Academy until 1940. In 1910–1911, he was president of the American Philological Association.

Rolfe translated many Latin authors, especially historians, for the Loeb Classical Library: Ammianus Marcellinus, Cornelius Nepos, Aulus Gellius, Quintus Curtius, Sallust, and Suetonius.

See also
Telegenius

References

External links
 
 
 

American classical scholars
American book editors
Cornell University alumni
Classical scholars of Cornell University
Harvard University alumni
Classical scholars of Harvard University
Classical scholars of the University of Michigan
Classical scholars of the University of Pennsylvania
1859 births
1943 deaths
People from Newburyport, Massachusetts
University of Michigan faculty
Latin–English translators
20th-century American translators